Juan Carlos Espinoza Reyes (born 5 July 1991) is a Chilean professional footballer who plays as a right-back for Chilean Primera División side Curicó Unido.

Honours

Club
Huachipato
 Primera División: 2012–C

Universidad Católica
 Primera División: 2016–C, 2016–A
 Supercopa de Chile: 2016, 2019

References

External links
 

1986 births
Living people
People from Talcahuano
People from Concepción Province, Chile
People from Biobío Region
Chilean footballers
Association football defenders
Chilean Primera División players
C.D. Huachipato footballers
Club Deportivo Universidad Católica footballers
O'Higgins F.C. footballers
Audax Italiano footballers
Coquimbo Unido footballers
Curicó Unido footballers